The 5th Louisiana Infantry Regiment was a unit of volunteers recruited in Louisiana that fought in the Confederate States Army during the American Civil War. Formed in June 1861, the regiment was sent to fight in the Eastern Theater of the American Civil War. The regiment served at Yorktown, White Oak Swamp, Cedar Mountain, Second Bull Run, Harpers Ferry, Antietam, and Fredericksburg in 1862. The regiment fought at Chancellorsville, Second Winchester, and Gettysburg in 1863. At Rappahannock Station in November 1863, virtually the whole regiment was captured. The unit's remnant fought at the Wilderness, Spotsylvania, Cold Harbor, and the Valley campaigns of 1864. It served at Petersburg starting in December 1864 and a mere handful surrendered at Appomattox in April 1865.

See also
List of Louisiana Confederate Civil War units
Louisiana in the Civil War

Notes

References

 

 

 

Units and formations of the Confederate States Army from Louisiana
1861 establishments in Louisiana
Military units and formations established in 1861
1865 disestablishments in Louisiana
Military units and formations disestablished in 1865